The Henn Mansion, also known as Ewing Hall, is a historic building located in Fairfield, Iowa, United States. A native of New York, Bernhart Henn served two terms in the United States House of Representatives representing Iowa's 1st congressional district as a Democratic. Previously he had served as the Registrar of the U.S. Land Office. He had this two-story, brick, Greek Revival house built in 1858. However, the financial panic of 1857 almost wiped out his fortune. The house is representative of the financial success one had in the  public sector in the pioneer economy. It was also the birthplace of Parsons College in 1875. The house was listed on the National Register of Historic Places in 1983.

References

Houses completed in 1858
Greek Revival houses in Iowa
Houses in Fairfield, Iowa
National Register of Historic Places in Jefferson County, Iowa
Houses on the National Register of Historic Places in Iowa
Individually listed contributing properties to historic districts on the National Register in Iowa
Maharishi International University